LongHorn Steakhouse is an American casual dining restaurant chain owned and operated by Darden Restaurants, Inc., headquartered in Orlando, Florida.  As of 2016, LongHorn Steakhouse generated $1.6 billion in sales in its 559 locations.

History
LongHorn Steakhouse was founded in 1981 by George McKerrow, Jr. and his best friend Brian. McKerrow was a former manager at Quinn's Mill Restaurant, a subsidiary of Victoria Station, a San Francisco-based concept with railroad cars used as dining areas that was popular in the US during the 70's and 80's.

The first location, originally called LongHorn Steaks Restaurant & Saloon, opened on Peachtree Street in Atlanta, Georgia. It was a former antique store, then an adult entertainment business. The walls were still painted black and some of the booths were divided by recycled black partitions. He filled it with steer heads and western paraphernalia. The LongHorn featured  steaks grilled in a butter sauce.

It was across from a very popular pub, Harrison's on Peachtree. Harrison's was the favorite hangout of Atlanta Journal and Constitution columnist Ron Hudspeth and Lewis Grizzard. Hudspeth regularly featured quotes from "Pete the barkeep" at Harrison's. Harrison's had a very limited bar menu. So, regulars ventured over to the LongHorn for a steak after a night of drinking.

However, in January 1982, a sudden snow storm that became known as SnowJam 82, trapped the area's commuter population within the city limits and McKerrow offered $1 drinks and menu specials to the stranded motorists. Hudspeth featured it in his column. This helped turn the struggling restaurant around.

By 1990, the franchise expanded further south. It primarily has locations throughout the Eastern United States. It also has many locations in the Midwest, Southwest, and Puerto Rico.

In August 2007, LongHorn Steakhouse, formerly owned and operated by RARE Hospitality International Inc., was purchased by Darden Restaurants, Inc.

Theme
LongHorn Steakhouse has a Western/Texan theme. Each restaurant is decorated with oil paintings, photos, and selected Western memorabilia that support this theme.

Menu

The restaurant is best known for serving various kinds of steak, including its "Flo's Filet". In addition to steak, the menu also includes ribs, chicken, salmon, lobster, shrimp, and salads. Appetizers include their "Texas Tonion" and "Wild West Shrimp"; and side dishes are also served. The restaurant offers a full bar with draft and bottled beer, wine, and several signature margaritas. A lunch menu that includes soups, salads, sandwiches, and hamburgers is available.

Doneness preference
According to research conducted between May 2016 - May 2017, 37.5 percent of diners preferred their steak done medium, 25.8 percent medium-well, 22.5 percent medium-rare, 11.7 percent well done, and only 2.5 percent preferred their steak to be rare.

References

External links
 
 Darden Restaurants, Inc. (Parent Company)

Companies based in Orlando, Florida
Restaurants established in 1981
Western-themed restaurants
Darden Restaurants brands
Restaurant chains in the United States
Steakhouses in the United States
1981 establishments in Georgia (U.S. state)
2007 mergers and acquisitions